Dejan Karan  (born 13 August 1988) is a Serbian former footballer with Hungarian nationality who played as a centre-back.

Club career

Early career
Karan played for Serbian SuperLiga clubs Vojvodina, Javor Ivanjica, Voždovac and Mladost Podgorica from Montenegro. From 10 July 2013, he signed for Kecskemét from Hungary, where he stayed two years until 31 July 2015.

Tirana
On 25 August 2015, Karan signed with the most successful club of Albania, Tirana, on a one-year deal with an option to renew it for another year. During his presentation, he said that his compatriot Ivan Gvozdenović had told to him "many good words for the club" and that he has heard that Tirana is the best Albanian club in history. He was given the number 5.

Diósgyőr
Karan signed his first contract with Diósgyőr on 10 July 2016 and this is his second time that he play in Hungary. One and a half seasons in Diósgyőr was enough to become standard player in this team and 17 January 2018, Karan signed new two years contract with this Hungarian football club. Karan after two and half years got Hungarian nationality. At the start of his four seasons in this club he became also captain of this team. Second time, Karan extended his contract 20 December 2019 for a new two years. Karan retired from playing at the end of the 2021–22 season.

References

External links

Dejan Karan at dvtk.eu
Dejan Karan at nemzetisport.hu
Dejan Karan at Utakmica.rs

1988 births
Living people
Footballers from Novi Sad
Serbian footballers
Serbia youth international footballers
Serbia under-21 international footballers
Serbian expatriate footballers
Serbian expatriate sportspeople in Montenegro
Serbian expatriate sportspeople in Albania
Hungarian footballers
Hungarian expatriate footballers
Hungarian expatriate sportspeople in Albania
Hungarian people of Serbian descent
Naturalized citizens of Hungary
Association football central defenders
Serbian SuperLiga players
FK Vojvodina players
FK Proleter Novi Sad players
FK Palić players
RFK Novi Sad 1921 players
FK Javor Ivanjica players
FK Voždovac players
Montenegrin First League players
OFK Titograd players
Nemzeti Bajnokság I players
Nemzeti Bajnokság II players
Kecskeméti TE players
Diósgyőri VTK players
Kategoria Superiore players
KF Tirana players